Montana is a 1950 American Western film directed by Ray Enright and starring Errol Flynn. It was only the second time Flynn played an Australian on screen, the first time being Desperate Journey (1942).

The film was Flynn's fourth and final pairing with frequent co-star Alexis Smith.

Plot
A narrator tells of the great wars that raged in Montana territory over the grazing of cattle versus sheep. Men on both sides of the battle died, but eventually it was the sheep herders who were driven out. Morgan Lane (Flynn), an Australian sheepman, rides to Montana territory in 1871. He and his men come across a sign declaring that any sheep herders crossing the line into the area will be shot on sight as the surrounding plains are strictly for cattle grazing. The men set up camp for the night just before the border. During the night their young unarmed Mexican watchman is shot dead by a local gang of cattle raisers.

The following morning, after Morgan and his men have buried the body, a travelling peddler known as Papa Schultz (Sakall) comes by. Morgan coerces Papa Shultz into pretending they are partners and they ride into town together so that Morgan can find out who the local ruffians are. In town he passes himself off as a peddler and discovers the gang in the saloon. Suspicious of him because he is a newcomer in the town, Slim Reeves challenges him to a pistol duel. Slim attempts to cheat by drawing before the count of three but Morgan proves his skills by shooting the gun out of his hand. 
Morgan discovers that there are three chief landowners in the area. The main two are Maria Singleton (Smith) and her fiancé Rod Ackroyd, who are both vehemently opposed to sheep herders in their area. The third is a man named Forsythe.

Morgan rides over to the Singleton ranch with a guitar as a present for Maria and the two get on well and have a sing-a-long together. Rod is suspicious of Morgan and is in a foul mood after being thrown from a wild stallion earlier in the afternoon. Maria invites Morgan to join them for dinner and Morgan reveals to them that he wishes to purchase some of their land. They believe he wants it for cattle grazing, and Rod makes a bet with him for the land. If Morgan can stay on the wild horse for exactly one minute, he can have the land. Rod's right-hand man Slim cuts the stirrup so that Morgan falls from the horse a few seconds before the minute mark. Maria, feeling sorry for Morgan, offers to rent him a piece of her land that would have belonged to her deceased brother. The following day she discovers that Morgan is a sheep herder and is livid at his betrayal.

During the night, Morgan rounds up the minority cattlemen in the area and enlists the help of the banker and Forsythe to fight another war with the cattle owners. Forsythe invites everyone to his home for a party and announces their intentions to fight. Maria confronts Morgan about his deceit and he tears the lease up and gives it back to her. She shares a kiss with him but then discovers that he intends to wage war against her and her friends and she becomes angry and leaves the party. Slim shoots and kills Forsythe which invokes a fight between Morgan and Slim, during which Slim fires his own gun and unintentionally kills himself.

Morgan, his men and the minority cattle owners are joined by the sheriff as they plan to take the sheep across the territory. The sheriff warns them that Rod and his men have organized a cattle stampede to trample the men and their sheep. Morgan and his men head off the stampede and manage to turn it, during which battle both the sheriff and Rod are killed. Morgan and his men intend to move the sheep through the territory by walking them through the main street of the town.

One of the men rides back to the Singleton ranch and informs Maria of Rod's death and Morgan's plans, claiming there is no one to stop him now. Maria takes a gun and rides into town where she stands in the middle of the main street and waits for Morgan. Morgan dismounts his horse when he sees Maria and walks towards her but she threatens to shoot him. He continues bringing the sheep along and she shoots him in the shoulder and he collapses on the ground. Seeing what she has done, she drops the gun and runs to Morgan, helping him and proving her affection. They bicker over how stubborn the other is and then share a kiss.

Cast
 Errol Flynn as Morgan Lane
 Alexis Smith as Maria Singleton
 S.Z. Sakall as Papa Schultz
 Douglas Kennedy as Rod
 Ian MacDonald as Reeves
 Lester Matthews as Forsythe
 Lane Chandler as Sheriff Jake Overby
 James Brown as Tex Coyne (uncredited)
 Art Gilmore as Narrator (uncredited)

Production

Development
Warner Bros had made a number of Westerns named after famous American cities, including Dodge City (film), Virginia City and Santa Fe Trail. In June 1940 they announced they were making a Western Montana, based on C. B. Glasscock's book The War of the Copper Kings.

In August 1941 Warner Bros announced that Errol Flynn would be appearing in the Technicolor Western Montana in 1941–42. Max Brand reportedly worked on the script. However America's entry into World War II appeared to delay the production.

After the war it was reported Eagle-Lion wanted to make a Western called Montana starring Joel McCrea. Then in July 1947 Warners seemed to reactivate the project - Vincent Sherman was named as director, William Jacobs producer and Thames Williamson to work on the script; Errol Flynn was listed as a possible star. However Errol Flynn disliked making Westerns. 1949 he told Hedda Hopper:
Acting for me is sheer fun. There's only one thing I really don't want to do any more and that's Westerns. I guess I've trod every back trail and canyon pass in the entire west. I've never literally had to read the line, 'they went that a-way pard', but there is one cliche I've said so many times it comes back to me in all my nightmares. Every time there's a gap in the story, every time the writers don't know what to do next, they have me pull up ahead of my gang, assume a decidedly grim look, and say 'All right men, you know what to do now.' The fact is I've made so many of these things, scripts seem so much the same, that what it adds up to in my mind is that the studio says, 'Here's a horse. Get on.'

In December 1947 it was announced that Ronald Reagan would play the lead in Montana, with the script based on a novel by Ernest Haycox. By January 1948 the film became officially part of Warners schedule for that year. The following month the studio announced it would be made with a budget of $2 million.

Eventually Warner Bros decided to give the film to Errol Flynn. In July 1948 they ordered him to return from his home in Jamaica and take the role under his contract. Later that month Ray Enright assigned to direct – his first film under a long-term contract with Warners. In August Alexis Smith and S.Z Sakall were announced as co-stars.

Shooting
Filming began August 1948, after Flynn had just completed a three-month boat trip on the Zaca.

The film reportedly started shooting with the script only half ready. James R. Webb and Charles G Booth were credited as working from a story by Ernest Haycox. Flynn missed some of filming due to illness.

According to Filmink magazine "This was the first Western Flynn made for Warners that does not seem to be hugely expensive – it's not a "B" by any means, just not a spectacle."

Reception

Critical
The Los Angeles Times said the film "won't set the cinema world on fire but it's solid Western entertainment." The Washington Post called it "a fair enough hour and a quarter."

Box Office
According to Variety the film earned $2.1 million domestically in 1950. The film earned £131,969 in the UK and had admissions of 1,899,891 in France.

According to Warner Bros records, the film earned $2,203,000 domestically and $1,444,000 overseas, making $3,647,000 over all. As its cost was $1,589,000 it is likely the film made a profit.

Soundtrack
Reckon I'm in Love 
Written by Mack David, Al Hoffman and Jerry Livingston
Sung by Errol Flynn and Alexis Smith
Old Dan Tucker
Traditional

Comic book adaptation
The film was released as a Fawcett Movie Comic #2

References

External links
 
 
 
 
 Review of film at Variety

1950 films
1950 Western (genre) films
American Western (genre) films
1950s English-language films
Warner Bros. films
Films set in Montana
Films adapted into comics
Films directed by Ray Enright
Films scored by David Buttolph
1950s American films